The Spring River is a short stream in Township 16, MD, Hancock County, Maine, USA.

See also
List of rivers of Maine

References

External links
 
 Maine Streamflow Data from the USGS
 Maine Watershed Data From Environmental Protection Agency

Rivers of Maine
Rivers of Hancock County, Maine